The Oslo Agreement is an album by Norwegian Hip-Hop group Paperboys.
It was released in 2009. It features the hit "Lonesome Traveler", which topped the charts in Norway for three weeks.

Track listing
 The Way
 Easy Street
 See Me Coming
 Into The Same
 On A High
 Lonesome Traveller
 The Greatest Thing
 I Be I
 12 Step
 Morning Rain
 After All
 Out Of Control

References

2009 albums